Sviridova is the feminine counterpart of Russian surname Sviridov. It may refer to:

People
 Alexandra Sviridova (born 1951), Russian-American writer, journalist and filmmaker
  (born 1962), three-time winner of the Russian Golden Gramophone Award
 Elena Sviridova (born 1988), Russian athlete in category T36 sprint events
  (born 1986), Russian theater and film actress
 Olesya Sviridova (born 1989), Russian shot putter; see Athletics at the 2013 Summer Universiade – Women's shot put
  (1882–after 1928), Russian poet, prose writer, translator, musicologist and music critic
  (1919–2012), Soviet volleyball player; see 1952 FIVB Volleyball Women's World Championship
  (born 1994), Russian gymnast

Other
 Sviridova, Kursk Oblast, a village in Oktyabrsky District of Kursk Oblast

See also
 Sviridov (disambiguation)